Samuel Mattocks (December 30, 1739 – January 18, 1804) was a Connecticut and Vermont Continental Army officer and political figure who served as Vermont State Treasurer during the state's early years.

Early life
Samuel Mattocks was born in Middletown, Connecticut on December 30, 1739.  He was living in Hartford and owned a wig-making shop when he joined the Army for the American Revolution.

American Revolution
He was a member of the 8th Connecticut Regiment, commanding a company with the rank of Captain. The regiment took part in action throughout New York, Pennsylvania and New Jersey, and Mattocks served until resigning in 1780, when he moved to Tinmouth, Vermont.

Life in Vermont
Mattocks farmed and also became active in politics and government. He served in the Vermont House of Representatives from 1781 to 1785, and was a member of the Governor's Council in 1785. He was Assistant Judge of Rutland County from 1783 to 1788, Chief Judge from 1788 to 1793, and Assistant Judge again in 1794. From 1786 to 1800 Mattocks was Vermont's State Treasurer, and in 1792 he was a member of the Council of Censors.  His term as Treasurer bridged the period from the founding of the Vermont Republic until Vermont achieved statehood in 1791.

Death and burial
Mattocks moved to Middlebury in 1797, and resided there until his death.  He died on January 18, 1804, and was buried in Middlebury's Washington Street Cemetery.

Family
Samuel Mattocks married Sarah Birdwell (or Burdell) on March 14, 1763. Their children included: Samuel Mattocks Jr. (1764-1823), who was an innkeeper in Middlebury and served in local office; Sarah (1767–1778); Rebecca (1768–1841), the wife of Samuel Miller of Middlebury; Mary (1770–1777); and John (1777–1847).

John Mattocks served in the United States House of Representatives and was Governor of Vermont from 1843 to 1844.

References

1739 births
1804 deaths
Politicians from Middletown, Connecticut
Politicians from Hartford, Connecticut
People from Tinmouth, Vermont
People from Middlebury, Vermont
Continental Army officers from Connecticut
Vermont state court judges
Members of the Vermont House of Representatives
People of pre-statehood Vermont
State treasurers of Vermont
Military personnel from Hartford, Connecticut